HMS Hampshire was a 50-gun fourth rate ship of the line of the Royal Navy, launched on 3 March 1698 at Nelson Dock, Rotherhithe.

Hampshire was broken up in 1739.

Notes

References

Lavery, Brian (2003) The Ship of the Line - Volume 1: The development of the battlefleet 1650-1850. Conway Maritime Press. .

Ships of the line of the Royal Navy
1690s ships
Ships built in Rotherhithe